Cambodia participated in the 2010 Summer Youth Olympics in Singapore.

Medalists

Athletics

Boys
Track and Road Events

Judo

Individual

Team

Swimming

References

External links
Competitors List: Cambodia

2010 in Cambodian sport
Nations at the 2010 Summer Youth Olympics
Cambodia at the Youth Olympics